The Regional Administrators of Eritrea are appointed centrally by the President of Eritrea. The Regional Administrators supervise and work in collaboration with their elected Regional Assemblies.

The Regional Administrator will also represent the Region (Zoba) in National Cabinet meetings and quarterly update meetings.

 Administrator of the Anseba Region: Selma Hassan
 Administrator of the Southern Region: Mustapha Nurhussein
 Administrator of the Gash-Barka Region: Musa Raba
 Administrator of the Central Region and mayor of Asmara: Semere Russom
 Administrator of the Northern Red Sea Region: Abdallah Mussa
 Administrator of the Southern Red Sea Region: Tsigereda Woldeghiergis

External links
Eritrea: Frozen and Reshuffled, Again

Government of Eritrea